Kisnop may refer to:

Kisnop, a former name of the SS Empire Dabchick
Kisnop Brook, a variant name of Schenob Brook